South of Pico is a 2007 drama film written and directed by Ernst Gossner set in Los Angeles.

Plot
In present-day Los Angeles, a chauffeur, a waitress, a doctor and a young boy each deal with life’s daily challenges. They find themselves at the scene of an accident the moment it happens. This becomes a defining moment in their lives.

One story is a chauffeur named Robert Spencer that assigned to drive a bride Angela (Christina Hendricks) to a wedding. He eyes her in back seat through the rear view mirror while she is pulling up her garter belt. She demands to stop for cigarettes at a local retail store. When he returns she holds him and tells him to kiss her and they have sex at the back of the limousine.

Cast
Kip Pardue as Robert Spencer
Henry Simmons as Dr. Walter Chambers
Gina Torres as Carla Silva
Soren Fulton as Patrick Wise
Christina Hendricks as Angela
Jimmy Bennett as Mark Weston
Giovanni Lopes as Jorge 
Paul Hipp as Comma
Car'ynn Sims as Francine
Gabrielle Christian as Astrid

Release
The film premiered at the American Black Film Festival in October 2007.

Awards
American Black Film Festival - 2007, Grand Jury Award - Best Picture
American Black Film Festival - 2007, Grand Jury Award - Best Actor for Henry Simmons
American Black Film Festival - 2007, Red Star Award for Originality, Innovation and Vision for Ernst Gossner
Pan African Film Festival - 2008, First Feature Competition - Best Director
Drehbuchverband Austria - 2008, Thomas Pluch Screenplay Award
International Innsbruck Film Festival - 2008, Audience Award
International Beijing Film Festival - 2008, Best Picture

Production
South of Pico was shot in various locations around Los Angeles. The story is inspired by a fatal road rage incident in Chicago 2003; a similar case happened in 2007 in Austin, Texas.

References

External links
 
 

2007 films
2007 drama films
American drama films
Films scored by John Swihart
Films set in Los Angeles
2000s English-language films
2000s American films